Pool A of the 2020 Billie Jean King Cup Asia/Oceania Zone Group I was the only pool in the Asia/Oceania zone of the 2020–21 Billie Jean King Cup. Six teams competed in a round robin competition and the top two teams advanced to Play-offs, while the bottom two teams were relegated to Group II. The event was moved and postponed a month from Dongguan, China to Dubai, United Arab Emirates due to the COVID-19 pandemic.

Standings 

Standings are determined by: 1. number of wins; 2. number of matches; 3. in two-team ties, head-to-head records; 4. in three-team ties, (a) percentage of matches won (head-to-head records if two teams remain tied), then (b) percentage of sets won (head-to-head records if two teams remain tied), then (c) percentage of games won (head-to-head records if two teams remain tied), then (d) Billie Jean King Cup rankings.

Round-robin

China vs. India

South Korea vs. Uzbekistan

Chinese Taipei vs. Indonesia

Chinese Taipei vs. South Korea

India vs. Uzbekistan

China vs. Indonesia

China vs. Chinese Taipei

India vs. South Korea

Indonesia vs. Uzbekistan

China vs. Uzbekistan 

Notes. Due to China's retirement from the doubles rubber, the scores are counted as 7–5, 6–0 win for Uzbekistan.

Chinese Taipei vs. India

Indonesia vs. South Korea

China vs. South Korea

Chinese Taipei vs. Uzbekistan

India vs. Indonesia

References

External links 
 Billie Jean King Cup website

2020–21 Billie Jean King Cup Asia/Oceania Zone